The Benjamin Barker House was a historic house on Main Road in Tiverton, Rhode Island.  Built c. 1850, it was a two-story wood-frame structure with an impressive Greek Temple front, with full-height fluted Ionic columns supporting a full triangular pediment.  The pediment (as did the gable at the opposite end of the house) had an astylistic triple window in it.  The roof was topped by an octagonal cupola with belvedere, with two narrow chimneys piercing the ridge line.  It is possible the house was designed by Russell Warren, who is documented to have designed a number of other high-style Greek Revival houses in the region.  The purchaser is believed to be Benjamin Barker, a lumber merchant operating in nearby Fall River, Massachusetts.

The house was listed on the National Register of Historic Places in 1980, after it was extensively destroyed by fire. It was demolished in 1981.  The property it stood on, at the northwest corner of the junction of Main Road and Rhode Island Route 24, was associated with The Coachman, a restaurant, and is now the site of an assisted living facility.

See also
National Register of Historic Places listings in Newport County, Rhode Island

References

Houses on the National Register of Historic Places in Rhode Island
Houses completed in 1850
Buildings and structures in Tiverton, Rhode Island
Houses in Newport County, Rhode Island
Burned houses in the United States
1980 fires in the United States
National Register of Historic Places in Newport County, Rhode Island
Greek Revival houses in Rhode Island
Demolished buildings and structures in Rhode Island
Buildings and structures demolished in 1981